David Emge (born September 9, 1946) is an American actor.  He played Stephen in George A. Romero's horror film Dawn of the Dead.

Career
One of Emge's classmates and acting partners while in college was Ron Glass, who later became famous as a starring member of the situation comedy Barney Miller. While working as a chef in a New York City restaurant, Emge met George A. Romero, who cast him in the role for which he would be most remembered, as Stephen in Romero's zombie epic, Dawn of the Dead. As of 2007, Emge participates in occasional acting and film conventions.

Filmography

References

External links

Radio interview  on Deathensemble.com (11 mins, 2011)

American chefs
American male chefs
American male film actors
Living people
1946 births